Promalactis quadratitabularis is a moth of the family Oecophoridae. It is found in Sichuan, China.

The wingspan is about 14–15 mm. The forewings have white markings edged with black scales. The hindwings and cilia are ochreous grey.

Etymology
The specific name is derived from Latin quadratus (meaning quadrate) and tabularis (meaning plate shaped) and refers to the quadrate apical plate of the aedeagus.

References

Moths described in 2013
Oecophorinae
Insects of China